Roberts Lipsbergs (born July 29, 1994 in Riga, Latvia) is a Latvian professional ice hockey centre who is currently playing for Dinamo Riga in the Kontinental Hockey League (KHL).

Playing career
Lipsbergs began his career with SK Riga 18 where he spent two seasons in their youth system before spending the 2011–12 season with HK Rīga.

On June 27, 2012, Lipsbergs was selected by the Seattle Thunderbirds in the CHL Import Draft.

In the 2013–14 season, on October 5, 2013, Lipsbergs became the first WHL player to score and complete a hat trick in the 1st period of a game.

On September 25, 2014, the Stockton Thunder announced they had signed Lipsbergs to a one-year standard player contract. After 15 games with the Thunder, Lipsbergs was returned to major junior with the Thunderbirds.

On July 11, 2015, Lipsbergs returned to the newly relocated Thunder organization, to resume his professional career in signing a one-year contract with Adirondack. On November 27, 2015, he was traded to the Utah Grizzlies. Lipsbergs featured in 37 games with the Grizzlies, contributing with 16 points before he was placed on waivers and claimed by the Tulsa Oilers on March 25, 2016.

Career statistics

Regular season and playoffs

International

References

External links

1994 births
Living people
Adirondack Thunder players
Dinamo Riga players
Latvian ice hockey centres
HK Liepājas Metalurgs players
HK Riga players
Ice hockey people from Riga
Seattle Thunderbirds players
Stockton Thunder players
Tulsa Oilers (1992–present) players
Utah Grizzlies (ECHL) players